Trachycardium egmontianum, the Florida prickly cockle, is a species of bivalve mollusc in the family Cardiidae.

Description

These shells are oval, with 27 to 31 strong, prickly, radial ribs. The external surface is whitish to tawny-gray or pale purplish, with yellow, brown or purplish pathes. The glossy interior is pink, reddish or purplish.

Distribution
This species can be found along the Atlantic coast of North America, ranging from North Carolina to Florida.

References

Shuttleworth, R.J. (1856). Description de nouvelles espèces. Première décade; espèces nouvelles pour la faune des Antilles. Journal de Conchyliologie. 5: 168-175, fig

Cardiidae
Bivalves described in 1856